Sirajul Islam Mia (born 1919 or 1920) is a Bangladesh Nationalist Party politician. He was elected member of parliament for Rangpur-22 in the 1979 Bangladeshi general election.

Career 
Mia was a member of the  3rd National Assembly of Pakistan representing Rangpur-III.

Mia was elected member of parliament for constituency Rangpur-22 as a Bangladesh Nationalist Party candidate in the 1979 Bangladeshi general election.

References 

Living people
Year of birth missing (living people)
Bangladesh Nationalist Party politicians
2nd Jatiya Sangsad members